Hyoseris radiata is a species of herb in the family Asteraceae. They have a self-supporting growth form and broad leaves. Individuals can grow to 23 cm.

Sources

References 

radiata
Flora of Malta